"The Spectre" is a song by Norwegian record producer and DJ Alan Walker incorporating uncredited vocals provided by Norwegian songwriter and producer Jesper Borgen. It was composed by Jesper Borgen, Alan Walker, Marcus Arnbekk, Mood Melodies and Lars Kristian Rosness, with production handled by the latter four, and lyrics written by all composers as well as Tommy La Verdi and Gunnar Greve. The Spectre has a tempo of 128 BPM, is in the key of C♯ minor, and lasts for 3 minutes and 13 seconds. The song was released via Mer Musikk on 15 September 2017.

Background
"The Spectre" is a vocal remake of Walker's 2015 single "Spectre", which was released through NoCopyrightSounds on 6 January 2015. On 22 December 2016, Walker debuted the song during the live show "Alan Walker is Heading Home", in his hometown Bergen, Norway. He has included the song in his live sets months ahead of the song's release, as well as playing a revised version of the song on the main stage at Tomorrowland Belgium 2017. In an interview with Dance Music Northwest, Walker described the song as "a newer version of my old song Spectre", similar to "what I did with 'Fade' to 'Faded'". Walker said of the song in a press release: "The reactions and feedback from people have been truly amazing, I'm very excited that's it's now being released officially. It's a song that I specifically want to dedicate to my core fans who've been following me since the start."

Critical reception
Your EDM felt the song "contains all of the common Alan Walker elements that international EDM fans have come to find and love", including "the sound design, faint dreamy vocals, the anthemic drop, and the patented Alan Walker lead". Comparing to Faded, they deemed it "a sleeker, more refined record", In 2022, the official music video accomplished 1 billion streams on YouTube, making it Walker's 3rd single to accomplish this milestone.

Credits and personnel
Credits adapted from Tidal.

 Alan Walker – songwriting, production
 Marcus Arnbekk – songwriting, production
 Mood Melodies – songwriting, production
 Lars Kristian Rosness – songwriting, production
 Jesper Borgen – songwriting, vocals
 Tommy La Verdi – lyrics
 Gunnar Greve – lyrics, executive production
 Sören von Malmborg – mastering engineering
 Fredrik Borch Olsen – co-production

Charts

Weekly charts

Year-end charts

Certifications

References

2017 singles
2017 songs
Alan Walker (music producer) songs
Songs written by Alan Walker (music producer)
Songs written by Jesper Borgen
Songs written by Gunnar Greve
Songs written by Mood Melodies